Doug Drexler (born in New York City) is a visual effects artist, designer, sculptor, illustrator, and a makeup artist who has collaborated with such talents as Al Pacino, Dustin Hoffman, James Caan, Meryl Streep, and Warren Beatty. He began his career in the entertainment industry working for makeup artist Dick Smith on such films as The Hunger and Starman. He has also contributed to Three Men and a Little Lady, The Cotton Club, FX, Manhunter and Dick Tracy. Dick Tracy earned Drexler an Oscar, as well as The British Academy Award and the Saturn Award for his special makeup effects on characters such as Big Boy Caprice (played by Pacino) and Mumbles (played by Hoffman). Two Emmy nominations in the same field followed for three years working on Star Trek: The Next Generation, where he performed such tasks as aging Captain Picard for "The Inner Light". His final make-up job for the series was the Mark Twain makeup worn by Jerry Hardin in the two part episode "Times Arrow"

In 1992 Drexler moved over to Star Trek: Deep Space Nine as designer, digital artist and effects artist. He continued in that capacity on the subsequent Star Trek films as well as Star Trek: Voyager. In April 2001 Drexler worked as senior Illustrator and CGI designer on the fifth Star Trek series, Enterprise. Following Enterprise, he was hired by Visual Effects Supervisor Gary Hutzel as CG Supervisor on Battlestar Galactica, "Caprica", "Blood and Chrome", and "Defiance". Doug won two Emmy Awards and a Visual Effects Society Award for Galactica.

Doug grew up on Long Island and attended Newfield High School.

As of 2015, he is also a member of the board of directors for the Hollywood Science Fiction Museum.

Credits in various fields

Prosthetic character makeup
 1982 The Hunger
 1983 The Cotton Club
 1984 C.H.U.D.
 1984 Starman
 1985 Heartburn
 1985 Manhunter
 1986 F/X
 1986 Making Mr. Right
 1987 Fatal Attraction
 1988 Liberace
 1988 Poltergeist III
 1990 Dick Tracy
 1990 Three Men and a Little Lady
 1990 True Identity
 1991 For the Boys
 1992 Shining Through
 1990-1993 Star Trek: The Next Generation

Design
 1993-1999 Star Trek: Deep Space Nine
 1994 Star Trek Generations
 1996 Star Trek: First Contact
 1998 Star Trek: Insurrection
 1998 Buckaroo Banzai: Ancient Secrets and New Mysteries (unproduced TV series)
 2001-2004 Star Trek: Enterprise
 2021-2022 The Orville
 2021-2022 Star Trek: Picard

Visual effects
 1999 Starship Troopers
 1999-00 Star Trek: Voyager
 2000 Max Steel
 2000 Star Trek: The Motion Picture -Director's Edition
 2001 Dan Dare
 2001-2004 Star Trek: Enterprise
 2004-2006 Star Trek New Voyages
 2004-2009 Battlestar Galactica
 2006 Future by Design
 2007 Area 57
 2008 Zeitgeist Addendum
 2009 Virtuality
 2009 Caprica
 2011 Drive Angry
 2012 Blood and Chrome
 2013 Defiance
 2021-2022 The Orville
 2021-2022 Star Trek: Picard

Books illustrated
 The Star Trek Encyclopedia by Michael and Denise Okuda. Simon & Schuster, publisher.
 Star Fleet Medical Reference Manual by Eileen Palestine and Geoffrey Mandel. Ballantine Books, publisher (Online).
 Star Trek Science Logs by Andre Bormanis. Simon & Schuster, publisher.
 Designing the Future by Jacque Fresco. The Venus Project, Inc., publisher.

Books illustrated and co-authored
 Star Trek: Deep Space Nine Technical Manual by Herman Zimmerman, Rick Sternbach, and Doug Drexler. Simon & Schuster, publisher.
 Star Trek Sticker Book by Michael and Denise Okuda, and Doug Drexler. Simon & Schuster, publisher.
 2001-2011 Star Trek - Ships of the Line Calendar Editor and contributing artist. Simon & Schuster, publisher.

Interactive CD-ROMs
 Star Trek: Captain's Chair, Simon & Schuster Interactive.
 The Star Trek Interactive Encyclopedia, Simon & Schuster Interactive.

On camera
Drexler has made a number of uncredited cameos in various projects during his career. Most notably in the film C.H.U.D as a police officer. He has appeared in numerous Star Trek episodes including The Next Generation as well as in the final episode of Enterprise. He also appears in the final episode of Battlestar Galactica. His other on-camera appearances have been in kitschy webseries and in a couple of Star Trek Fan Films. In May 2013 he played a holographic gunslinger in Pilgrim of Eternity, the first episode of the fan produced webseries Star Trek Continues.

References

External links
 Doug Drexler  startrek.com
 

Living people
American designers
American illustrators
American sculptors
Best Makeup Academy Award winners
Best Makeup BAFTA Award winners
Emmy Award winners
Year of birth missing (living people)